Powerspace was a four-piece power pop band from Chicago, Illinois. They were signed to Fueled by Ramen. The band released their debut album, The Kicks of Passion produced by Marc McClusky, on July 31, 2007.

History
The band first began performing while students at Miami University.  Chicago native guitar player Tom Schleiter and fellow Miami student and Green, Ohio drummer Kevin Kane who had played in another band on campus, were joined on bass by Daniel McMahon, a friend of Schleiter’s from when they both attended St. Viator High School in Arlington Heights, Illinois.  After a search for a vocalist, another Miami student and friend, Alec Cyganowski joined the group. The band began touring and developed a reputation for energetic live shows, sparking a large amount of interest from record labels. The band moved back to Chicago and signed to Fueled By Ramen Records, who released their first full-length, The Kicks of Passion, on July 31, 2007. A spot playing at SXSW and nationwide touring ensued in the US in 2007, opening for Hawthorne Heights, Amber Pacific, Monty Are I, Melee, From First to Last, and The Red Jumpsuit Apparatus.  Most recently, the band's single "Powerspace Snap Bracelet" was featured in SPIN, who also reviewed their album, and the band was profiled in Aquarian magazine. The band has toured with The Classic Crime,  Envy on the Coast, Kaddisfly, Madina Lake, Mayday Parade, Brighten, We The Kings, and at PunkSpring in Tokyo Japan in support of the album.

In January 2008 Tom Schleiter took a temporary leave from Powerspace to complete his degree at Miami University.  Guitarist Max Perenchio filled in while Tom was attending college.  Tom rejoined the band to play in Tokyo at PunkSpring, and after graduation.

Starting on April 16, 2008 and ending on the morning of April 17, several of the guys took part in an all night chat on the forum, absolutepunk.net. Along with fans that stayed all night, they broke the previous record, held by The Audition, for most posts in a news thread, with over 5100 replies over about 8 hours.

On May 20, 2008, Dan made the decision to leave the band. He was replaced on tour by Jake Serek.

Powerspace was scheduled to release a full length titled "American Machine" in early 2010 but on February 17, 2010, Powerspace officially broke up before releasing their new album.

The breakup letter was quoted as saying, "Powerspace as everyone knows it is 100% gone, and speaking about it in the past tense is still a very new thing for me, but for these guys to give up music entirely would be a crime. And they're not, and I'm not, and that's about all I can say. So keep tabs."

Currently, guitar player Tom Schleiter is successfully writing and producing music at his studios in LA and Nashville, under the pseudonym 'Tommy English', working with artists such as Børns, Kacey Musgraves, and Adam Lambert. Tom was nominated for a 2017 Grammy Award for Engineering on K.Flay’s album “Every Where is Some Where”. Singer Alec Cyganowski is living in Los Angeles and has started a new band called CYGZ and is currently releasing new music, with an album slated to come out at the end of 2020. Drummer Kevin Kane is pursuing his Ph.D. in Comparative Literature at The University at Buffalo.  Bassist Dan McMahon is in an electronic rock band called duck, who have released an EP on their BandCamp page. The EP "Bassment Family", was produced by Tom Schleiter.

Members

Alec Cyganowski - Lead Vocals
Tom Schleiter - Guitar
Kevin Kane - Drums
Daniel McMahon - Bass

Discography

Albums
2006: Houston, We Have a Party (EP)
2007: The Kicks of Passion (album)
2010: American Machine (album) (unreleased)

Singles
"Right On, Right Now" 2007

References

External links
Official Purevolume
Official website

Pop punk groups from Illinois
Musical groups from Chicago
Fueled by Ramen artists
2004 establishments in Illinois
2010 disestablishments in Illinois
Musical groups established in 2004
Musical groups disestablished in 2010